Leif Erickson (July 29, 1906 – December 22, 1998) was an American attorney who served as an Associate Justice of the Montana Supreme Court from 1939 to 1945.

Biography
Erickson was born in Cashton, Wisconsin. He was one of seven children of Oluf Erickson (1874–1963) and Dora B. Erickson (1876–1974).  The family later moved to western North Dakota. Erickson attended high school in Sidney, Montana, attended the University of North Dakota and graduated from University of Chicago Law School, where he earned his J.D. degree in 1934. On December 29, 1932, he married Huberta Burton Brown. He died in Missoula, Montana.

Career
Erickson was Richland County District Attorney from 1936 to 1938 and was an Associate Justice of the Montana Supreme Court from 1939 to 1945. He was a delegate to the Democratic National Conventions in 1948, 1952, and 1956. In 1944, he ran for Governor of Montana, winning the Democratic primary and advancing to the general election, where he opposed Republican incumbent Gov. Sam C. Ford. Ford ended up defeating Erickson by a wide margin to win his second term as governor. Erickson challenged incumbent Sen. Burton K. Wheeler in the Democratic primary in 1946, and though he ended up defeating Wheeler in an upset, he lost the general election to Republican State Senator Zales Ecton. He ran for governor once more in 1948, but finished third in the Democratic primary behind former Montana Attorney General John W. Bonner and Arthur Lamey. From 1956 to 1958 he was chairman of the Montana Democratic Party and from 1962 to 1973 he was a member of the Democratic National Committee.

References

1906 births
1998 deaths
People from Monroe County, Wisconsin
People from Richland County, Montana
University of Chicago alumni
Montana lawyers
Montana Democrats
Justices of the Montana Supreme Court
American people of Norwegian descent
American Lutherans
20th-century American judges
20th-century American lawyers
20th-century Lutherans